The Burnshirt River is a  stream in Worcester County, Massachusetts. It is a tributary of the Ware River, draining ultimately into the Connecticut River and thence the Long Island Sound.

From there it flows through forest and marshes south to Williamsville, then southeast to join the Ware River about two miles east of Barre. It is stocked with trout for fishing.

For much of its length, the river is paralleled by the former Ware River Railroad, now the Ware River Rail Trail.

See also
List of rivers of Massachusetts

References

External links
 Ware River Watershed Land Management Plan
 Environmental Protection Agency

Rivers of Worcester County, Massachusetts
Tributaries of the Connecticut River
Rivers of Massachusetts